

Churches in Chernihiv

Monasteries in Chernihiv
Chernihiv is famous for its three monasteries: Eletsky Monastery, St. Elias Monastery, and Trinity Cathedral Monastery. The monasteries are south of the city center in the area of Boldina Gora.

References

List
List
Chernihiv-related lists
Lists of religious buildings and structures in Ukraine